Akgul Amanmuradova and Ekaterine Gorgodze were the defending champions but chose not to participate.

Samantha Murray Sharan and Jessika Ponchet won the title, defeating Alicia Barnett and Olivia Nicholls in the final, 6–4, 6–2.

Seeds

Draw

Draw

References
Main Draw

Engie Open Nantes Atlantique - Doubles